Gather the Faithful is the debut studio album of Finnish power metal band Cain's Offering, an all-star project started by former Sonata Arctica guitarist Jani Liimatainen. It was recorded in 2009 in different studios in Finland and was released on July 22, 2009 in Japan via Avalon. On the band's website the band stated that they're "right now concentrating on the following European/US release, which most likely will be end of August" and that they're "in negotiations with a well-known label, and will soon be able to announce the deal and tentative release date." The album was mixed by Jimmy Westerlund in Los Angeles, Hollywood and mastered by Eddy Schreyer at Oasis Mastering, Los Angeles, Burbank. On June 25 the band announced that their debut album will be released on August 28 in Europe and on September 11 in the USA by Frontiers Records.

The tracks "Stolen Waters" and "Ocean of Regrets" were written when Liimatainen and Jani Hurula were still members of Paul Di'Anno's touring band.

Track listing 
All songs written by Jani Liimatainen.

 "My Queen of Winter" - 4:15
 "More Than Friends" - 4:20
 "Oceans of Regret" - 6:21
 "Gather the Faithful" - 3:50
 "Into the Blue" - 4:25
 "Dawn of Solace" - 4:18
 "Thorn in My Side" - 4:07
 "Morpheus in a Masquerade" - 6:51
 "Stolen Waters" - 4:35
 "Tale Untold" (Bonus track for Japan) - 4:08
 "Elegantly Broken" - 2:46

Charts

Credits
Cain's Offering
Timo Kotipelto - lead vocals
Jani Liimatainen - guitars, additional keyboards, backing vocals, programming on all tracks, choir on "More Than Friends"
Jukka Koskinen - bass
Mikko Harkin - keyboards
Jani Hurula - drums

Additional musicians
Petri Aho, Antti Railio - backing vocals, choir on "More Than Friends"
Janne Hurme - Choir on "More Than Friends"

Unreleased Track
On Jani Hurula's Myspace profile, he uploaded an unreleased track called "13th Disciple" with Jani Liimatainen on vocals rather than Timo Kotipelto.

References

External links
Official Cain's Offering MySpace

2009 debut albums
Cain's Offering albums
Frontiers Records albums